Wilson Bowden plc was a British housebuilding and general construction company headquartered in Coalville in central England.

History
Wilson Bowden was the holding company for David Wilson Homes and its commercial property subsidiary, Wilson Bowden Properties, the name being adopted at the time of the group's flotation in 1987. David Wilson joined his father’s joinery workshop in 1960 and during that decade gradually moved the business into housebuilding. By the early 1970s, AH Wilson (as it was then named) was building around 150 houses a year in the Leicestershire area. A joint property investment with First National Finance Corporation, Bowden Park Holdings, was wholly acquired in 1973 when First National got into financial difficulty.

David Wilson expanded substantially in the 1980s with sales rising from 300 to 1,600 in the decade, while group profits increased from £2 million to £40 million. As a result of conservative land buying policies, Wilson Bowden survived the recession of the early 1990s better than most of its competitors. Wilson then began to move out from its East Midlands heartland. New offices were opened in the West Midlands, Hereford, Hertfordshire and Kent in 1992; Leeds in 1993; Cheshire in 1997 and Glasgow in 1999. Wilson also made some strategic acquisitions including the Berkshire firm of Trencherwood in 1996, which had a dominant position in the West Berkshire land market, and the old-established housing business of Henry Boot plc in 2003. By then, Wilson was building over 4,000 units a year and was regarded as one of the most consistently successful of the quoted housebuilders.
  
David Wilson had run the business for forty years and experiments were made to ensure a controlled succession. However, in April 2007, just ahead of the next housing recession, the company was sold to Barratt Developments for £2.2 billion.

Operations
The company had three divisions:
David Wilson Homes: a general housebuilder that operated in most parts of England, Scotland and Wales
Wilson City Homes: constructed urban residential buildings
Wilson Bowden Developments Limited: undertook retail, leisure, industrial and office development projects

References

External links

 David Wilson Homes official site
 Barratt Homes official site

Housebuilding companies of the United Kingdom
Companies based in Leicestershire
Manufacturing companies established in 1961
British companies established in 1961
Barratt Developments